The Bently Nob Hill is an apartment building situated on the highest point of the Nob Hill, San Francisco neighborhood. The tower was designed by residential architect William E. Schirmer in 1924; it was inspired by Spanish and Moorish architecture and built in the Art deco architectural style of the 1920s. The structure's slender water tower pavilion is directly modeled after the Royal Palace in Marrakech.

The building is a San Francisco landmark and one of the most prominent in the Nob Hill neighborhood.

Bently Nob Hill is 10 stories high and contains  of one and two bedroom apartments.

References

Apartment buildings in San Francisco
Nob Hill, San Francisco
Art Deco architecture in California
Mediterranean Revival architecture in California